The Gaon Album Chart is a South Korean record chart that ranks the best-selling albums and EPs in South Korea. It is part of the Gaon Music Chart, which launched in February 2010. The data are compiled by the Ministry of Culture, Sports and Tourism and the Korea Music Content Industry Association based upon weekly and monthly physical album sales by six major South Korean distributors: LOEN Entertainment, S.M. Entertainment, Sony Music Korea, Warner Music Korea, Universal Music and Mnet Media.

In 2011, there were 44 albums which reached number one on the weekly chart. Girls' Generation, Big Bang, and JYJ topped the chart with three different albums each, more than any other act. CNBLUE, Kim Hyun-joong, and Super Junior each had two number one albums on the chart. The longest chart run on the weekly chart at number one was Girls' Generation's The Boys and Super Junior's Mr. Simple; both spent four weeks at the top of the chart. On the monthly chart, TVXQ and BigBang had the most album number-ones, with two each. Girls' Generation's The Boys topped the monthly chart for three consecutive months from October to December.

Overall, Girls' Generation's The Boys album was the Gaon Album Chart's best-selling album of 2011, selling 385,348 copies. For The Boys, Girls' Generation earned two awards at the 2011 Mnet Asian Music Awards: Artist of the Year, and Best Female Group. The second highest-selling album was Super Junior's Mr. Simple, which sold 343,348 copies; a repackaged version titled A-CHa sold 129,894 copies. Super Junior had combined sales of 479,329 units for both albums, and Mr. Simple won Disk Album of the Year at the Golden Disk Awards, and Album of the Year at the Mnet Asian Music Awards in 2011.

Weekly charts

Monthly charts

Notes

References

External links 
  Current Gaon Album Chart

2011 in South Korean music
Korea, South albums
2011